XTC (translated phonetically to Ecstasy) is the debut studio album by American R&B and soul singer-songwriter Anthony Hamilton, released October 29, 1996 on Uptown and MCA Records in the United States. The album failed to chart on both the Billboard 200 and the Top R&B/Hip-Hop Albums charts, and subsequently went out of print. Its only single, "Nobody Else", charted at number sixty-three on the Hot R&B/Hip-Hop Songs chart.

Track listing

References

1996 debut albums
Anthony Hamilton (musician) albums
MCA Records albums